Akbar Ahmad Dumpy (born 30 June 1948) is an Indian politician and was member of the 12th and 14th Lok Sabha (1998–99) from Azamgarh Constituency in Uttar Pradesh state in India.

Life and career 
Akbar Ahmad Dumpy completed his schooling from The Doon School and later went to Canning College. He was elected as Member of Uttar Pradesh Legislative Assembly  in 1980 from Haldwani as member of Indira Congress. He was Sanjay Gandhi's friend and known as 'Dumpy' in his circle. When rivalry developed between Rajiv Gandhi and Maneka Gandhi's factions after Sanjay Gandhi's death in 1980, Indira Gandhi suspended Akbar Ahmad Dumpy, who was in Maneka camp, from Congress in 1982. When Maneka Gandhi launched Sanjay Vichar Manch in 1982, she appointed Akbar Ahmed as its convenor.

In 1987 Dumpy again got elected to Uttar Pradesh Legislative Assembly in a by-election from Kashipur Vidhan Sabha Constituency. As a candidate of Sanjay Vichar Manch, of Maneka Gandhi Dumpy defeated Indian National Congress candidate Ammar Rizvi. 

Akbar Ahmad Dumpy was elected to the 12th Lok Sabha in 1998 from Azamgarh Constituency on a Bahujan Samaj Party ticket. Dumpy again got elected from Azamgarh Constituency on a Bahujan Samaj Party ticket.

He is the second husband of actor Naina Balsavar.

References

External links
 Twelfth Lok Sabha Members Bioprofile - Ahmad, Akbar
 

20th-century Indian Muslims
India MPs 1998–1999
All India Indira Congress (Tiwari) politicians
Bahujan Samaj Party politicians from Uttar Pradesh
Lok Sabha members from Uttar Pradesh
The Doon School alumni
Politicians from Lucknow
Politicians from Azamgarh district
Living people
1948 births
India MPs 2004–2009
Indian National Congress politicians from Uttar Pradesh